The following are ranks of the officers working in the Income Tax Department of Ministry of Finance (India). Officers are appointed from two different recruiting agencies. Gazetted officers are appointed from Indian Revenue Service (Income Tax) of Union Public Service Commission while non-gazetted officers are recruited by Staff Selection Commission.

Ranks of the Income Tax Department

Alternative designations 

 Principal Chief Commissioner of Income Tax  – Principal Director General of Income Tax
 Chief Commissioner of Income Tax  – Director General of Income Tax
 Principal Commissioner of Income Tax  – ADG/ Principal Director of Income Tax
 Commissioner of Income Tax  – Additional Director General/ Director of Income Tax
Additional Commissioners of Income Tax  – Additional Director of Income Tax
 Joint Commissioner of Income Tax  – Joint Director of Income Tax 
 Deputy Commissioner of Income Tax  – Deputy Director of Income Tax 
 Assistant Commissioner of Income Tax  – Assistant Director of Income Tax 
 Assistant Commissioner of Income Tax (IRS Probationary Rank: 2 years of service)
 Assistant Commissioner of Income Tax  (IRS Probationary Rank: 1 year of service)

References

External links
Official Website of Income Tax Swatantra of India
Official Website of Indian Revenue Service
Training Academy for Members of Indian Revenue Service - Income Tax

Income Tax Department
Ranks
India